Badod is a city situated in Agar Malwa district in the state of Madhya Pradesh, India. Badod has tehsil headquarters as well as nagar parishad in Agar Malwa District. 
Both the Choti Kalisindh and Kachal rivers flow nearby the town.

Temples 
In the west of city rests the Jain Temple "Nageshwar Tirth" and in the east, the famous Bagalamukhi Temple and Baijnath Temple. Historical and religious places include Lal Mata Mandir, Dudhakhedi Mandir, Barod Fort, and Vimalnath Jain Temple.

Demographics

As of the 2011 Census of India, Badod had a population of 13,834. Males constitute 52% of the population and females 48%. Badod has an average literacy rate of 63%, higher than the national average of 59.5%; with 60% of the males and 40% of females literate. 18% of the population is under 6 years of age.

References

Cities and towns in Agar Malwa district